Elbe tunnel most commonly refers to:

 Elbe Tunnel (1975) in Hamburg, which is part of Bundesautobahn 7.
 Elbe Tunnel (1911) in Hamburg, which connects St. Pauli and Steinwerder.

It may also refer to:

 A tunnel projected near Glückstadt, which will be part of Bundesautobahn 20.
 A tunnel proposed as an alternative to the disputed Dresden Waldschlösschen Bridge.